Milledgeville is a village in Carroll County, Illinois, United States. The population of the village was 1,026 at the 2020 census. The town was named for the mill at the edge of the village, which was torn down in 1908.

Geography

Milledgeville is located at  (41.963763, -89.774372).

The nearest shopping and commerce area to the village is in the towns of Sterling and Rock Falls, about 12 miles south of downtown Milledgeville, while the closest major shopping, entertainment, and city amenities are in Rockford, which is about 45 miles to the northeast of downtown Milledgeville.

The village is located 110 miles from downtown Chicago (2.5 hour drive) and about 85 miles away (1.5 hour drive) from the nearest Chicago suburbs of Sugar Grove/Aurora.

Education
The village of Milledgeville and surrounding rural area are a part of a consolidation with neighboring Chadwick, with the K-12 being in the Milledgeville School building and Pre-k at the Chadwick school building, therefore, forming the Chadwick-Milledgeville Community Unit District #399. The school district's website is www.dist399.net and the high school uses a missile as its mascot. On top of the marquee at the school is an actual missile. The official sports team moniker is the Missiles.

Higher education can be attained within a reasonable driving distance at either Sauk Valley Community College in Dixon

Demographics

As of the 2020 census there were 1,026 people, 478 households, and 248 families residing in the village. The racial makeup of the village was 91.91% White, 0.68% African American, 0.39% Asian, 1.27% from other races, and 5.75% from two or more races. Hispanic or Latino of any race were 2.53% of the population.

There were 478 households, out of which 39.75% had children under the age of 18 living with them, 39.75% were married couples living together, 5.02% had a female householder with no husband present, and 48.12% were non-families. 41.84% of all households were made up of individuals, and 19.04% had someone living alone who was 65 years of age or older. The average household size was 2.72 and the average family size was 2.04.

The village's age distribution consisted of 22.6% under the age of 18, 12.7% from 18 to 24, 18.3% from 25 to 44, 21.6% from 45 to 64, and 25.0% who were 65 years of age or older. The median age was 41.4 years. For every 100 females, there were 100.2 males. For every 100 females age 18 and over, there were 105.9 males.

The median income for a household in the village was $43,661, and the median income for a family was $69,167. Males had a median income of $44,500 versus $30,948 for females. The per capita income for the village was $30,203. About 14.1% of families and 19.7% of the population were below the poverty line, including 35.3% of those under age 18 and 2.4% of those age 65 or over.

References

External links
 Village of Milledgeville

Villages in Carroll County, Illinois
Villages in Illinois